Live at The Brown Owl is a live album by Cool Hand Luke frontman Mark Nicks. During the spring of 2009, he toured solo with his vintage stage piano, performing the band's songs and telling the stories that inspired them. He decided to record these performances and included stories as interludes between songs.

2010 live albums